Denys Viktorovych Chernyshov (born 11 July 1974 in Kharkiv) is Ukrainian politician and economist. He has been a Deputy Minister of Justice of Ukraine from October 2016 to September 2019. He holds a PhD in Law.

Early life and career 

After completing his secondary education, he entered the Kyiv National Economic University, majoring in Business Economics, and in 1996 received a Master's degree in Business Administration from the same institution.

In 2017, he entered the Master's program at the Faculty of Law of Taras Shevchenko National University of Kyiv and received a Master's degree in Law in 2019.

In October 2019, he received his PhD in Law. The title of his dissertation is Administrative and Legal Principles of Probation in Ukraine.

He started his career in 1996 as an economist of the 2nd category at the State Export-Import Bank of Ukraine (hereinafter — Ukreximbank), where he continued to work until 2010 in management positions.

From 2010 to 2015, he held senior positions at PJSC Bank Petrocommerce-Ukraine and PJSC JSB Ukrgasbank.

From October 2016 to September 2019, he served as Deputy Minister of Justice of Ukraine.

From September 2019 to March 2020, he is an advisor to the Chairman of the Board of PJSC JSB Ukrgasbank.

From March 2020 to the present, he has been the Deputy Chairman of PJSC JSB Ukrgasbank.

Political career
On October 19, 2016, Denys Chernyshov was appointed to the post of Deputy Minister of Justice of Ukraine. On September 11, 2019, in sync with the Cabinet of Ministers, he resigned from his post of his own free will.

Reform of the penitentiary system
In order to enhance work of the justice system bodies, in 2016 the Cabinet of Ministers of Ukraine adopted a resolution that abolished the State Prison Service, and delegated its powers to the Ministry of Justice.
Deputy Minister of Justice Denys Chernyshov was appointed responsible for the implementation of the reform. He is in charge of coordination and control.

Interim results of the reform
 Uniting regional administrations into six interregional offices has significantly reduced bureaucracy and made the system more transparent.
 The reform of medical service is being implemented at the moment. The main goal is to make doctors independent from a head of a colony. For this purpose, the Ministry has established a medical department that will be controlling all doctors in penal institutions. In the future, this medical service is to be subordinated to the Ministry of Health of Ukraine.
 In February 2017, the Juvenile Probation Center was opened in Kyiv. This is the first center which is a part of the official organizational structure of the probation authority comprised by the Ministry of Justice of Ukraine.
 Opening of Juvenile Probation Centers is planned in Odesa, Rivne, Dnipro, Mykolaiv, Zhytomyr and Mariupol.
 The Department for Inspection of Human Rights in Penitentiary Institutions was established in the structure of the Ukrainian Ministry of Justice.

Measures taken by the Department of Organizational Support for Penitentiary Services 
 Systemic violations of human rights revealed during monitoring visits of the representatives of Parliament Human Rights Commissioner's Secretariat and the Committee for the Prevention of Torture have been analyzed. Requirements were sent to inter-regional offices with the aim of approximating the conditions of detention of convicts as well as persons taken into custody to European standards.
 The state of suicides prevention has been studied. The review indicating the directions of activity has been issued and sent to the heads of territorial bodies.
 The state of providing supervision over convicts serving sentences in correctional centers, correctional colonies with minimal security level and social rehabilitation sites has been analyzed. The review indicating the directions of activity has been issued and sent to the heads of territorial bodies.
 The state of prison escapes prevention has been analyzed. Relevant reviews indicating specific measures were sent to the establishments.
 Special operations "Backstop" and "Shield" were carried out to ensure order during the New Year holidays from December 19, 2016, to January 9, 2017.
 A visit of Committee for the Prevention of Torture to Ukraine.

What has been prepared? 
 Amendments to the internal order regulations of detention centers and a draft of the Ministry of Justice order "On Approving the Procedure of Internet Access for Convicts";
 Changes in the procedure for carrying out official investigations in Penitentiary Service; in order and registration of applications and reports on criminal offenses and other events in penal institutions and detention centers; in the procedure of implementing measures to ensure safety of persons held in penal institutions and pre-trial detention centers; in the procedure of access to personal data from a single information system of the Ministry of Internal Affairs; in the instruction on the organization of covert investigative (search) operations and using their results in criminal proceedings; in departmental normative documents on the organization of operational and investigative activities in Ukrainian Penitentiary Service;
 Proposals to the draft law "On the Penitentiary System" to improve the order of unhindered visits to penal institutions and expansion of the categories of persons, who can be kept at pre-trial detention centers for work.

Changes have been initiated in 
 Resolutions of Cabinet of Ministers of Ukraine #1662 "On the Approval Of the List Of Occupational Diseases" about recognition of tuberculosis as an occupational disease among staff of the institutions and establishments;
 Laws "On Military Duty and Military Service" and "On Mobilization Preparation and Mobilization".

Adoption of the Law "On the Supreme Council of Justice"
The Law of Ukraine "On the Supreme Council of Justice", adopted by the Parliament on December 21, 2016, is designed to solve the eternal problems of the penitentiary system connected with the prompt response to criminal offenses by both administration of the penitentiary institutions and the convicts, an objective investigation of cases, and punishment of the perpetrators.
It is this part of the reform of the Penitentiary System that is a priority for the Ministry of Justice, since the inclusion of investigative units of the bodies of the State Penitentiary Service in the system of pre-trial investigation bodies will, first of all, allow to guarantee discipline and order in prisons, significantly reduce the number of crimes and increase the level of responsibility about crimes committed in penal institutions and pre-trial detention centers.

Family
Denys Chernyshov is married. He has a daughter.

References

External links
 Website of the Ministry of Justice of Ukraine
 Banker embarks on overhauling Ukraine’s Soviet-era prison system

Living people
1974 births
Kyiv National Economic University alumni
Taras Shevchenko National University of Kyiv alumni
Politicians from Kharkiv
21st-century Ukrainian economists
Ukrainian bankers